Androsace vitaliana is a species of plant in the primrose family, Primulaceae. It was previously known by the synonym Vitaliana primuliflora. Native to the high mountains of Europe, it is cultivated as an alpine garden plant, being considered easy to grow in well drained soil in a sunny position.

Description
The flowers are usually unstalked (sessile) and are bright yellow in colour. The flowers are borne singly at the ends of the leaf rosettes. Like the genus Primula, flowers are heterostylous, having pin and thrum forms.

Taxonomy
The species was first described by Carl Linnaeus in 1753 as Primula vitaliana. In 1845, Antonio Bertoloni placed it as the only species in a new genus, Vitaliana, using the replacement name Vitaliana primuliflora. It has also been placed in the genus Douglasia as Douglasia vitaliana. Molecular phylogenetic studies have shown that it is embedded within Androsace.

Subspecies
Six subspecies have been identified, with distinct distributions in the high mountains of Europe:
A. vitaliana subsp. assoana – Iberian Peninsula excluding the Pyrenees
A. vitaliana subsp. cinerea – south-western Alps
A. vitaliana subsp. lepontina – Pennine Alps
A. vitaliana subsp. praetutiana – Apennines
A. vitaliana subsp. sesleri – south-eastern Alps
A. vitaliana subsp. vitaliana – Pyrenees

Distribution and habitat
Androsace vitaliana is native to the high mountains of Europe in Spain, France, Italy, Switzerland and a small part of Austria. It is usually found above , on screes and rocks and in stony meadows.

Cultivation
Androsace vitaliana is cultivated as an alpine garden plant. It is regarded as easy to grow in well drained but fertile soil in a sunny position. It can be propagated easily by removing rosettes with attached roots from a plant in late summer and growing them on.

References

External links
 Androsace vitaliana (L.) Lapeyr. | Plants of the World Online | Kew Science

vitaliana
Flora of Austria
Flora of France
Flora of Italy
Flora of Spain
Flora of Switzerland